The 2008–09 Florida Gators men's basketball team represented the University of Florida in the sport of basketball during the 2008–09 college basketball season.  The Gators competed in Division I of the National Collegiate Athletic Association (NCAA) and the Eastern Division of the Southeastern Conference (SEC).  They were led by head coach Billy Donovan, and played their home games in the O'Connell Center on the university's Gainesville, Florida campus. The Gators were looking to build on their 24–12 record from the 2007–08 season.

Preseason
Entering the season, the Gators had to overcome the loss of Marreese Speights, who after his sophomore season, left for the 2008 NBA Draft. Speights was selected by the Philadelphia 76ers. To help replace his presence on the court, the Gators welcomed six freshmen to the team. The Gators won their two preseason games against Rollins and Warner.

Class of 2008 

|-
| colspan="7" style="padding-left:10px;" | Overall Recruiting Rankings:     Scout – 9     Rivals – 10       ESPN – 2 
|}

Roster

Coaches

After the season, assistant coach Shaka Smart left to become head coach of the VCU Rams.

Schedule and results
Retrieved from Gatorzone.com

|-
!colspan=12 style=|Exhibition games

|-
!colspan=12 style=|Regular Season

|-
!colspan=12 style=|SEC Tournament 

|-
!colspan=12 style=|National Invitation Tournament

Rankings

References 

Florida Gators men's basketball seasons
Florida
Florida Gators men's basketball team
Florida Gators men's basketball team
Florida